The day-year principle or year-for-a-day principle is a method of interpretation of Bible prophecy in which the word day in prophecy is considered to be symbolic of a year of actual time. It was the method used by most of the Reformers, and is used principally by the historicist school of prophetic interpretation. It is held by the Seventh-day Adventist Church, Jehovah's Witnesses, and the Christadelphians. The day-year principle is also used by the Baháʼí Faith, as well with by most all astrologers who employ the "Secondary Progression" theory, aka the day-for-a-year theory, wherein the planets are moved forwards in the table of planetary motion (known as an ephemeris) a day for each year of life or fraction thereof.  The astrologers say that the four seasons of the year are directly spiritually, phenomenologically like the four "seasons" of the day.

Biblical basis 
Proponents of the principle, such as the Seventh-day Adventists, claim that it has three primary precedents in Scripture:
 . The Israelites will wander for 40 years in the wilderness, one year for every day spent by the spies in Canaan.
 . The prophet Ezekiel is commanded to lie on his left side for 390 days, followed by his right side for 40 days, to symbolize the equivalent number of years of punishment on Israel and Judah respectively.
 . This is known as the Prophecy of Seventy Weeks. The majority of scholars do understand the passage to refer to 70 "sevens" or "septets" of years—that is, a total of 490 years.
While not listed as primary precedent by the proponents, a direct reference to the day-for-a-year concept is made in Genesis.
 . Laban requires an additional seven years of work in contract for Rachel's hand in marriage, calling it a week.

Jon Paulien has defended the principle from a systematic theology perspective, not strictly from the Bible.

History 
The day-year principle was partially employed by Jews as seen in Daniel 9:24–27 ,Ezekiel 4:4-7 and in the early church. It was first used in Christian exposition in 380 AD by Ticonius, who interpreted the three and a half days of Revelation 11:9 as three and a half years, writing 'three days and a half; that is, three years and six months' ('dies tres et dimidium; id est annos tres et menses sex'). In the 5th century Faustus of Riez gave the same interpretation of Revelation 11:9, writing 'three and a half days which correspond to three years and six months' ('Tres et dimidius dies tribus annis et sex mensibus respondent), and in c. 550 Primasius also gave the same interpretation, writing 'it is possible to understand the three days and a half as three years and six months' ('Tres dies et dimidium possumus intelligere tres annos et sex menses'). The same interpretation of Revelation 11:9 was given by later expositors like Anspert, Haymo, and Berengaudus (all of the ninth century). Primasius appears to have been the first to appeal directly to previous Biblical passages in order to substantiate the principle, referring to Numbers 14:34 in support of his interpretation of the three and a half days of Revelation 11:9. Haymo and Bruno Astensis "justify it by the parallel case of Ezekiel lying on his side 390 days, to signify 390 years ; — i. e. a day for a year. — ".  Protestant Reformers were well established on the day/year principle and it was also accepted by many Christian groups, ministers, and theologians.

Others who expounded the Historicist interpretation are John Wycliffe, John Knox, William Tyndale, Martin Luther, John Calvin, Ulrich Zwingli, Philip Melanchthon, Isaac Newton, Jan Hus, John Foxe, John Wesley, Jonathan Edwards, George Whitefield, Charles Finney, C. H. Spurgeon, Matthew Henry, Adam Clarke, Albert Barnes, and Bishop Thomas Newton.

Christian historicist application

70 weeks or 490-year prophecy 
Daniel 9 contains the Prophecy of Seventy Weeks.
Biblical Scholars have interpreted the 70 weeks vision in the Historistical methodology for nearly two millennia as illustrated in the following table.

The vision of the 70 weeks is interpreted as dealing with the Jewish nation from about the middle of the 5th century BCE until not long after the death of Jesus in the 1st century CE and so is not concerned with current or future history.  Historicists consider Antiochus Epiphanies irrelevant to the fulfillment of the prophecy.

Historicist interpretation of the Prophecy of Seventy Weeks was that it foretells with great specificity information about Jesus as the Messiah, not some lowlevel official or antichrist figure. Daniel 9:25 states that the 'seventy weeks' (generally interpreted as 490 years according to the day-year principle)  is to begin "from the time the word goes out to restore and rebuild Jerusalem," which is when the Persian king Artaxerxes I, gave the decree to rebuild Jerusalem to Ezra, so the 490 years point to the time of Christ's anointing.

In the 21st century this interpretation (emphasized by the 19th-century Millerite movement) is still held by Seventh-day Adventists and other groups.

Seventh-day Adventists
The Seventh-day Adventist interpretation of Daniel chapter 9 presents the 490 years as an uninterrupted period.  Like others before them they equate the beginning of the 70 weeks "from the time the word goes out to rebuild and restore Jerusalem," of Daniel 9:25 with the decree by Artaxerxes I in 458/7 BCE which provided money for rebuilding the temple and Jerusalem and allowed for restoration of a Jewish administration. It ends 3½ years after the crucifixion. The appearance of "Messiah the Prince" at the end of the 69 weeks (483 years) is aligned with Jesus' baptism in 27 CE, in the fifteenth year of Tiberius Caesar. The 'cutting off' of the "anointed one" refers to the crucifixion 3½ years after the end of the 483 years, bringing "atonement for iniquity" and "everlasting righteousness". Jesus is said to 'confirm' the "covenant" between God and mankind by his death on the cross in the Spring (about Easter time) of 31 CE "in the midst of" the last seven years. At the moment of his death the 4 inch (10 cm) thick curtain between the Holy and Most Holy Places in the Temple ripped from top to bottom, marking the end of the Temple's sacrificial system. The last week ends 3½ years after the crucifixion (i.e., in 34 CE) when the gospel was redirected from only the Jews to all peoples.

Some of the representative voices among exegetes of the last 150 years are E. W. Hengstenberg, J. N. Andrews, E. B. Pusey, J. Raska, J. Hontheim, Boutflower, Uriah Smith, and O. Gerhardt.

To understand 70-week prophecy of Daniel 9:24-27, one has to use the key. The Prophecy of Seventy Weeks becomes clear, as pointing to the messiah using the prophetic day-year principle. Using this, the 69 weeks, or the 483 years of Daniel 9, culminates in A.D. 27. Now "unto Messiah the Prince" makes sense and indicates the time for the coming of the "anointed one" or Messiah, with the final week during His ministry. It is not the time of the Messiah's birth but when He would appear as the Messiah, and this is right when Christ took up His ministry after being baptized. Thus the prophetic day-year principle correctly points to the anointed as the Messiah in A.D. 27 or the fifteenth year of Tiberius, not in the future or modern time. While there are other possible ways of reckoning, the beginning point of 457 B.C. as the starting point of the 70-week prophecy as the Messianic prophecies points to Jesus as the Messiah.

The seven and sixty-two-week periods are most frequently understood as consecutive, non-overlapping chronological periods that are more or less exact in terminating with the time at which Christ is anointed with the Holy Spirit at his baptism, with the terminus a quo of this 483-year period being the time associated with the decree given to Ezra by Artaxerxes I in 458/7 BCE. The reference to an anointed one being "cut off" in verse 26a is identified with the death of Christ and has traditionally been thought to mark the midpoint of the seventieth week, which is also when Jeremiah's new "covenant" is "confirmed" (verse 27a) and atonement for "iniquity" (verse 24) is made.

1260 year prophecy 
Historicist interpreters have usually understood the "time, times and half a time" (i.e. 1+2+0.5=3.5), "1,260 days" and "42 months" mentioned in Daniel and Revelation to be references to represent a period of 1260 years (based on the 360 day Jewish year multiplied by 3.5).

These time periods occur seven times in scripture:
, "time, times and a half".
, "time, times and a half".
, "42 months".
, "1260 days".
, "1260 days".
, "time, times and a half".
, "42 months".

Historicists usually believe the "1,260 days" spanned the Middle Ages and concluded within the early modern or modern era. Although many dates have been proposed for the start and finish of the "1,260 days", certain time spans have proven to be more popular than others. The majority of historicists throughout history have identified the "1,260 days" as being fulfilled by one or more of the following time spans and identify the Papal Office as the Antichrist and culmination of the Great Apostasy:

 312 AD to 1572: Battle of the Milvian Bridge/Vision of Constantine to St. Bartholomew's Day massacre
 606 AD to 1866
 538 AD to 1798: Siege of Rome to Napoleon's Roman Republic.
 756 AD to 2016 Donation of Pepin to (presumed) fall of Papacy.:
 774 AD to 2034 Charlemagne overthrows last Lombard King.  
 800 AD to 2060 Charlemagne is crowned Holy Roman Emperor by the Pope.

Seventh-Day Adventist interpretation 

The Millerites, like the earlier Bible students of the Reformation and post-Reformation eras and the Seventh-day Adventists,
 understand the 1260 days as lasting AD 538 to 1798 as the duration of the papacy over Rome. This period began with the defeat of the Ostrogoths by the general Belisarius and ended with the successes of French general Napoleon Bonaparte, specifically, the capture of Pope Pius VI by general Louis Alexandre Berthier in 1798.
Seventh-day Adventist use of this principle in Daniel 8:14 is deemed to be of extra-biblical authority (i.e., William Miller/Ellen White-church prophetess) due to the Hebrew word "yowm" not extant in the text of Daniel 8:14. This is the word necessary to meet the Numbers 14:34 and Ezekiel 4:6 day/year principal texts.

Other views 
Robert Fleming writing in 1701 (The Rise and Fall of Rome Papal) stated that the 1260-year period should commence with Pope Paul I becoming a temporal ruler in AD 758 which would expire in 2018 by counting Julian years, or the year 2000 if counting prophetic (360 day) years.

Charles Taze Russel, founder of the Watchtower Society (now known as Jehovah's Witnesses), originally taught that "1874 onward is the time of the Lord's second presence" using the day-year principal to understand the Bible. Later, under the leadership of Joseph Rutherford, Jehovah's Witnesses revised this teaching to state that they "pointed to 1914 as the time for this great event to occur." This is the doctrine still in use today.

756 to 2016 

British Theologian Adam Clarke writing in 1825 stated that the 1260-year period should commence with 755 AD, the actual year Pepin the Short invaded Lombard territory, resulting in the Pope's elevation from a subject of the Byzantine Empire to an independent head of state. The Donation of Pepin, which first occurred in 754 and again in 756 gave to the Pope temporal power over the Papal States. However, his introductory comments on Daniel 7 added 756 as an alternative commencement date. In April of that year, Pepin, accompanied by Pope Stephen II entered northern Italy from France, forcing the Lombard King Aistulf to lift his siege of Rome, and return to Pavia. Following Aistulf's capitulation, Pepin remained in Italy until finalizing his Donations. Based on this, 19th century commentators anticipate the end of the Papacy in 2016:

Of the five areas of the Bible which mention this timeline, only Revelation 11:9-12 adds a brief 3½ more years to the end of this 1260-year period. If added to 2016, this would bring us to autumn of 2019 or spring of 2020 for the commencement of the Eternal Kingdom. However, far more attention is paid by historicists to 2016 as the final end of the Papacy and the commencement of the Millennial rule than there is to 2019. This may be due in part, to uncertainty as to who or what the two witnesses of the Book of Revelation represent. But for those 17th to 19th century historicists adhering to the day year principle who also predicted a literal restoration of the unconverted Jews in their original homeland, the fall of the Papacy immediately precedes the rapid conversion of the Jews. The two events are closely linked, with the former enabling the latter.

The year 756 AD is also thought to occur 666 years from John's writing of the Book of Revelation. The verse in Daniel 8:25 which reads "...but he shall be broken without hand" is usually understood to mean that the destruction of the "little horn" or Papacy with not be caused by any human action. Volcanic activity is described as the means by which Rome will be overthrown. The following excerpt is from the 5th edition (1808) of the Rev. David Simpson's book "A Plea for Religion and the Sacred Writings":

{{blockquote|text= "Antichrist will retain some part of his dominion over the nations till about the year 2016." "And when the 1260 years are expired, Rome itself, with all its magnificence, will be absorbed in a lake of fire, sink into the sea, and rise no more at all for ever*."}}

Though the end of the 1260 years will be marked by dramatic events, it will not instantly remove all the governments of the world. The Messianic Kingdom will be established in place of the former Roman Empire, and continue to expand until it has enveloped the remaining countries. The following is an excerpt from "the Covenanter", a Reformed Presbyterian publication (1857):

While Daniel 2:35 makes reference to the various world powers (represented as various metals) being “broken to pieces together”, the previous verse (v.34) portrays the Eternal Kingdom coming as “a stone cut from a mountain without hands” and striking a statue (symbolizing the successive world empires) on its feet first. Most adherents of the day-year principle, interpret these feet “that were of iron and clay,” as denoting the nations descended from and occupying areas of the former Roman Empire.William Greenfield “Pillar of Divine Truth” London: Samuel Bagster (1831), page 232: “The Roman empire became weakened by a mixture of barbarous nations, by the incursions of whom it was torn asunder about the fourth century after Christ, and at length divided into ten kingdoms, answering to the ten toes of the image, and the ten horns of the beast. The ten kingdoms into which the western Roman empire was divided were, primarily, according to Machiavel and Bp. Lloyd, 1. The Huns in Hungary, A. D. 356. 2. The Ostrogoths in Moesia, 377. 3. The Visigoths in Pannonia, 378. 4. The Sueves and Alans in Gascoigne and Spain, 407. 5. The Vandals in Africa, 407. 6. The Franks in France, 407. 7. The Burgundians in Burgundy, 407. 8. The Heruli and Turingi in Italy, 476. 9. The Saxons and Angles in Britain, 476. 10. The Lombards first, upon the Danube, 526, and afterwards in Italy. Though the ten kingdoms differed from these in later periods, and were sometimes more or less, yet they were still known by that name.” The dominions of all the empires and nations are expected to be crushed simultaneously, but the end of “life” or existence of the Roman derived countries will precede that of the other nations of the world.James Bicheno “The Restoration of the Jews” London: Bye and Law (1800), page 48: “The destruction is to begin at the toes of the image, the kingdoms into which the Roman empire has been divided.”

The length of time for this worldwide expansion to complete is indicated in Daniel 7:12, which adds “As concerning the rest of the beasts, they had their dominion taken away: yet their lives were prolonged for a season and time.” Henry Folbigg (1869) elaborated on this verse:

Prior to Adam Clarke (Methodist), Jonathan Edwards, an Evangelical Reformed (Congregational) theologian commented on the views of his more well-known predecessors and contemporaries, and wrote that Sir Isaac Newton, Robert Fleming (Presbyterian), Moses Lowman (Presbyterian), Phillip Doddridge (Congregational), and Bishop Thomas Newton (Anglican), were in agreement that the 1,260 timeline should be calculated from the year 756 AD.

F.A. Cox (Congregationalist) confirmed that this was the view of Sir Isaac Newton and others, including himself:

Thomas Williams also acknowledged that this was the predominant view among the leading Protestant theologians of his time:

The timeline was also printed in other denominational publications including Lutheran, Reformed, Baptist, Unitarian (Socinian), and in countries with sizeable Protestant populations such as the United Kingdom, France, Germany, Netherlands and the United States.

Catholicon, a monthly Catholic publication, implied (1816) that this timeline was more accurate than the other predictions of the time:

In 1870 the newly formed Kingdom of Italy annexed the remaining Papal States, depriving the Pope of his temporal rule. Unaware that Papal rule would be restored, (albeit on a greatly diminished scale) in 1929 as head of the Vatican City state, the historicist view that the Papacy is the Antichrist rapidly declined in popularity as one of the defining characteristics of the Antichrist (i.e. that he would also be a political temporal power at the time of the return of Jesus) was no longer met.

In spite of its one time predominance, the 2016 prediction was largely forgotten and no major Protestant denomination currently subscribes to this timeline.

 2300 year prophecy 

The 2300 days are understood to represent 2300 years stretching from 457 BC, the calculated starting date of the 70 weeks prophecy based on the 3rd decree found in Ezra, to 1844.William Shea, "". Journal of the Adventist Theological Society 12:1 (Spring 2001), pp. 89–96.

The prophecy of 2300 days in Verse 14 plays an important role in Seventh-day Adventist eschatology. The Seventh-day Adventist Church traces its origins to the William Miller, who predicted that the second coming of Jesus would occur in 1844 by assuming that the cleansing of the Sanctuary of Daniel 8:14 meant the destruction of the earth, and applying the day-year principle.

The prophetic time always uses the day-year principle, thus "2300 days" was understood to be 2300 years. Starting at the same time as the Prophecy of Seventy Weeks found in Chapter 9, on the grounds that the 70 weeks were "decreed" (actually "cut off") for the Jewish people from the 2300-day prophecy. This beginning year is calculated to be 457 BC (see details here), then the end of the 2300 years would have been in 1844.

Although the Millerites originally thought that 1844 represented the end of the world, those who later became Seventh-day Adventist reached the conclusion that 1844 marked the beginning of a divine pre-advent judgment called "the cleansing of the sanctuary". It is intimately related to the history of the Seventh-day Adventist Church and was described by the church's prophet and pioneer Ellen G. White as one of the pillars of Adventist belief.Venden, Morris, 1982, "The Pillars", Pacific Press, p. 13-15.

Baháʼí Faith application
 Baháʼí recognition of the 2300 day-year prophecy 

Followers of the Baháʼí Faith also recognize the Day-Year Principle and use it in understanding prophecy from the Bible. In the book, Some Answered Questions, `Abdu'l-Bahá outlines a similar calculation for the 2300-year prophecy as given in the Christian section above. By applying the day-year principle, he demonstrates that the fulfillment of the vision of Daniel occurred in the year 1844, the year of the Báb's declaration in Persia i.e. the starting date of the Baháʼí Faith. This is the same year that the Millerites predicted for the return of Christ, and Baháʼís believe that William Miller's methodologies were indeed sound.

The prophecy states "For two thousand three hundred days; then the sanctuary shall be cleansed." (Daniel 8:14)
Baháʼís understand the "cleansing of the sanctuary" to be the restoration of religion to a state in which it is guided by authorities appointed by its Founder rather than by people who have appointed themselves as the authority. (The leaders of Sunni Islam were self-appointed; the first 12 leaders of Shia Islam had been appointed through a chain of succession going back to Muhammad, but that chain ended after 260 years—see next section below.)
Thus Baháʼís believe that divinely-guided religion was re-established in 1844 with the revelation of the Báb, continued through the revelation of the Baháʼí founder (Baha'u'llah) and continues today through their Universal House of Justice, elected according to the method described by Baha'u'llah.

Although Christians have generally expected their Messiah to appear somewhere in Judeo-Christian lands, Baháʼís have noted that Daniel himself was in Persia at the time the prophecy was made. He was in Shushan (modern day Susa or Shūsh, Iran), when he received his prophetic vision (Daniel 8:2). The Bab appeared 2300 years later in Shiraz, about 300 miles away from where Daniel's vision occurred.

 Convergence of 1260-day prophecy and the 2300-day prophecy 

The year 1260 was significant in Shia Islam, independently of any Biblical reference. The Shia branch of Islam followed a series of 12 Imams, whose authority they traced back to Muhammad. The last of these disappeared in the Islamic year 260 AH. According to a reference in the Qur'an, authority was to be re-established after 1,000 years. For this reason, there was widespread anticipation among Shi'ites that the 12th Imam would return in Islamic year 1260 AH. This is also the year 1844 AD in the Christian calendar. Thus both the Millerites and the Shi'ites were expecting their Promised One to appear in the same year, although for entirely independent reasons.

Therefore, Baháʼís understand the 1260-day prophecies in both Daniel and in the Book of Revelation as referring to the year 1260 of the Islamic calendar which corresponds to the year 1844 AD, the year the Báb pronounced himself to be a Messenger of God and the year that the Baháʼí Faith began.

 Day-year principle in Revelation 9:15 (391 days) 

Baháʼís have also applied the Day-Year principle to Rev. 9:15 which states, "And the four angels were loosed, which were prepared for an hour, and a day, and a month, and a year, for to slay the third part of men."

The slaying of "the third part of men" was interpreted by some Christian scholarsMichael Paget Baxter, The Coming Battle (W. Harbert, Philadelphia, 1860). to refer to the fall of the Eastern Orthodox part of Christianity, centered on Constantinople in the year 1453 AD. (The other two-thirds being the Western Christian world, centered on Rome, and the southern part of the Christian world in North Africa, which was already under the dominion of Islam long before 1453.) Using the day-year principle, the formula gives 1+30+360 days = 391 days = 391 years after 1453. Adding 391 years to 1453 brings the prediction again to 1844, the same year as the 2300 day prophecy of Daniel 8.

Theoretically, this prophecy could be taken one step further, since there are accurate records of the dates of the start and end of battle for Constantinople. If "the hour" is taken to be 1/24th of a day, then, by the day-year principle, it would equate to 1/24 of a year i.e. 15 days. Since the battle of Constantinople lasted for several weeks, it is not possible to pin down the exact starting day of this 391-1/24-year prophecy, but if the formula is followed to this degree, it suggests the prophecy's fulfillment should have occurred sometime in May or June 1844.

 Day-year principle in Daniel 12: 1290- and 1335-day prophecies 

In addition, Baháʼís have applied the Day-Year principle to the two prophecies at the end of the last chapter of Daniel concerning the 1290 days (Dan 12:11) and the 1335 days (Dan 12:12). The 1290 days is understood as a reference to the 1290 years from the open declaration of Muhammad to the open declaration of Baha'u'llah. The 1335 days is understood to be a reference to the firm establishment of Islam in 628 AD to the firm establishment of the Baháʼí Faith (the election of its Universal House of Justice) in 1963 AD.

 See also 
 Abomination of desolation
 Christian eschatology
 Daniel 7
 Daniel 8
 Day-age creationism
 Four Horsemen of the Apocalypse
 Great Disappointment
 Historicism
 Judgment day
 Premillennialism
 Prewrath
 Prophetic Year
 Post-tribulation rapture
 Rapture
 Whore of Babylon

 References 

Further reading
Supportive:
 William H. Shea, "Year-Day Principle – Part 1" (p67–104) and Part 2 (p105–110) in Selected Studies in Prophetic Interpretation; Daniel and Revelation Committee Series, vol 1. Maryland: Biblical Research Institute/Review and Herald, rev edn, 1982. Part 1 has been called "arguably the [Adventist] church’s best scholarly defense of the day-year principle."
 Gerhard F. Hasel, “The Hebrew Masculine Plural for ‘Weeks’ in the Expression ‘Seventy Weeks’ in Daniel 9:24” (AUSS 31/2 [1993] 105–18).
 Frank W. Hardy, “The Hebrew Singular for ‘Week’ in the Expression ‘One Week’ in Daniel 9:27” (AUSS 32/3 [1994] 197–202).
 Desmond Ford, Daniel appendix (note the author has since changed his position – see below)

Undetermined:
 Kai Arasola, The End of Historicism'' (PhD thesis). This is a history, which includes the decline of use of the day-year principle

Christian eschatology
Seventh-day Adventist theology
Numerology
Prophecy in Christianity
Hermeneutics